Unione Sportiva Pianese is an Italian football club from Piancastagnaio, Tuscany. They play in Serie D.

History
The club was founded in 1930. They won their first promotion to Serie D in 2009–10, and successively their first league title in the top amateur league of Italy in 2018–19, thus ensuring themselves the right to play Serie C.

From 2006 to 2019, in compliance with Italian rules regarding amateur clubs, U.S. Pianese changed its name in U.S. Pianese A.S.D.

In February 2020, Pianese became the first professional football club to report a case of a player, King Udoh tested COVID-19 during the COVID-19 pandemic.

Current squad
.

References

External links
Official homepage

Football clubs in Tuscany
Association football clubs established in 1930
1930 establishments in Italy